Oregon Department of Fish and Wildlife v. Klamath Indian Tribe, 473 U.S. 753 (1985), was a case appealed to the US Supreme Court by the Oregon Department of Fish and Wildlife. The Supreme Court reversed the previous decisions in the District Court and the Court of Appeals stating that the exclusive right to hunt, fish, and gather roots, berries, and seeds on the lands reserved to the Klamath Tribe by the 1864 Treaty was not intended to survive as a special right to be free of state regulation in the ceded lands that were outside the reservation after the 1901 Agreement.

Background
In return they retained  for a reservation. It was expressly stated in the 1864 Treaty the Tribe would be secured "the exclusive right of taking fish in the streams and lakes, included in said reservation".

Government surveyors surveyed the reservation boundaries two different times, once in 1871 and again in 1888. Both surveys failed to include large tracts of land which included the meadows of the Sycan and Sprague River valleys which were originally intended for the reservation.

After many years of tribal complaints, The United States Congress authorized a commission from the General Land Office to determine the amount and value of the excluded land. This figure was based on soil quality, grazing lands, and timber. The Klamath Tribes' hunting, fishing, and trapping rights were not mentioned in the commission's report.

In 1901, the Bureau of Indian Affairs negotiated an agreement with the Klamath Tribe for cession of the excluded lands. In Article I, the tribe agreed to "cede, surrender, grant, and convey to the United States all their claim, right, title and interest in and to" that land. The United States Congress ratified the agreement in 1906. Virtually all ceded lands were immediately closed to entry and placed in national forests or parks.

Case
In 1982 the Klamath Tribe filed suit against the Oregon Department of Fish and Wildlife, along with various state officials, in Federal District Court seeking an injunction against the department's interference with tribal members' hunting and fishing activities on the previously ceded lands in the 1901 Agreement. The District Court entered judgement in favor of the Tribe and declared that the 1901 Agreement "did not abrogate" the Tribe's 1864 "Treaty rights....to hunt, fish, trap, and gather, free from regulation by the...State of Oregon" on the lands ceded to the United States.

The Court of Appeals affirmed the District Court's decision. The Court held that the 1864 Treaty had reserved the Tribe's rights to hunt and fish and the cession of lands in the 1901 Agreement did not specifically include the hunting and fishing rights. The Court of Appeals asserted that the tribe had retained all the rights that were not specified in the cession.

The issue in this case is that the Klamath Tribal members were asserting that they had the right to hunt and fish outside the boundaries of the reservation established in the 1901 Agreement including the lands ceded in the agreement. The tribes agreed that they had no rights to hunt and fish on the ceded lands that were currently privately owned. The question the court was considering was whether or not the Tribe reserved a special right to hunt and fish on the ceded lands and were free of state regulation through the 1901 Agreement. The Court pointed out that the language in the 1864 Treaty indicated that the Tribe's right to hunt and fish was restricted to the reservation and not on any of their additional ceded lands. In addition, the language in the 1901 Agreement did not evidence any intent to preserve special off-reservation hunting or fishing rights for the Tribe.

See also 
Related cases
 United States v. Winans, 198 U.S. 371 (1905).
 Carpenter v. Shaw, 280 U.S. 363 (1930).
 Puyallup Tribe v. Department of Game of Washington, 391 U.S. 392 (1968).
 Washington v. Washington Commercial Passenger Fishing Vessel Assn., 443 U.S. 658 (1979).
 Kimball v. Callahan, 590 F.2d 768 (1979).
 Red Lake Band of Chippewa Indians v. Minnesota, 449 U.S. 905 (1980).

Other
 List of U.S. Supreme Court Cases involving Indian tribes

References

External links
 

United States Supreme Court cases
United States Supreme Court cases of the Burger Court
United States Native American case law
1985 in United States case law
Native American history of Oregon